The Who Tour 2012–2013 was their third to feature the 1973 album Quadrophenia. Billed as "Quadrophenia and More", the band played Quadrophenia in its entirety, followed by a selection of their greatest hits. Before starting the tour, the group gave a special performance at the closing ceremonies of the 2012 Summer Olympics.

History
The band gave their first performance since a January 2011 charity appearance during the closing ceremonies for the 2012 Summer Olympics on 12 August, performing a short medley comprising "Baba O'Riley", "See Me, Feel Me" and "My Generation". A few weeks earlier they had announced a two leg stint that would feature the Quadrophenia album for a third time. They toured behind the album's original release, but their use of backing tapes to duplicate its musical complexity caused problems when the tapes malfunctioned and the band had difficulty playing along to them. They revisited the rock opera during their 1996–97 tour, this time with much greater success.

An announcement about the tour came through the band's website and social media networks on 18 July and coincided with a promotional documentary for the album, entitled The Who: Quadrophenia – Can You See The Real Me? The documentary was only screened in select theatres on 24 July in the United States, and on 25 July in Canada. The documentary featured never before seen footage from the band's first Quadrophenia tour including footage from its opening night in San Francisco, California, In which drummer Keith Moon collapsed twice and resulted in Scot Halpin, an audience member, filling in for Moon. Tickets for The Who's official fan club were given the first opportunity to purchase tickets on 20 July. American Express cardholders were given a presale date of 23 July. General tickets went on sale 27 July. The Who also announced on 19 July that they would honour tickets for the band's cancelled show in Providence, Rhode Island from 1979, following the tragic concert disaster in Cincinnati at the Riverfront Coliseum, in which 11 people were trampled and killed. The tickets were honoured at their Providence show in 2013, the final date of the tour.

The band retained bass player Pino Palladino and guitarist/backing vocalist Simon Townshend for these shows, but parted ways with longtime keyboard player John "Rabbit" Bundrick. Keyboard player Chris Stainton, who had appeared on the original Quadrophenia album, played with the group for the closing ceremonies for the Summer Olympics and originally intended to join them for the tour as well, but he withdrew prior to the start of the tour to tour with Eric Clapton. Keyboardists John Corey and Loren Gold were instead added to the line-up along with keyboardist/arranger Frank Simes and a brass section. Drummer Zak Starkey missed several shows in February 2013 due to a tendon injury and was replaced for those dates by Scott Devours; Devours would again substitute for Starkey during the band's June–July European tour. The group tacked on an additional appearance as part of 12-12-12: The Concert for Sandy Relief at Madison Square Garden at the end of the 2012 segment of the tour and did the same for a Teen Cancer America charity event at the Theater at Madison Square Garden along with Elvis Costello at the end of the 2013 North American segment.

Live releases
The show on 8 July 2013 at Wembley Arena (the last of the tour) was released as Quadrophenia Live in London.

Tour band

Original members
Roger Daltrey – lead vocals, harmonica, acoustic guitar, tambourine
Pete Townshend – lead guitar, acoustic guitar, vocals
John Entwistle – bass (via audio and archival footage on 5:15 filmed 27 November 2000 at Royal Albert Hall)
Keith Moon – vocals (via audio and archival footage on Bell Boy filmed 18 May 1974 at Charlton)

Backing musicians
Zak Starkey – drums (except on 5–14 February 2013; 8 June 2013 – 8 July 2013)
Scott Devours – drums (5–14 February 2013; 8 June 2013 – 8 July 2013)
Pino Palladino – bass guitar
Simon Townshend – rhythm guitar, acoustic guitar, vocals, (keyboards at 2012 Summer Olympics Closing Ceremony)
Billy Nicholls – musical director, backing vocals (2012 Summer Olympics Closing Ceremony)
Morgan Nicholls – bass guitar (2012 Summer Olympics Closing Ceremony)
Chris Stainton – piano, keyboards (2012 Summer Olympics Closing Ceremony)
Loren Gold – keyboards, backing vocals
Frank Simes - music director, keyboards, backing vocals
John Corey – piano, keyboards, backing vocals
J. Greg Miller – brass
Reggie Grisham – brass

Setlists

2012 Summer Olympics Closing Ceremonies

"Baba O'Riley"
"See Me, Feel Me"
"My Generation"

Quadrophenia and More Tour
The tour got off to a problematic start during the encore at the first show in Sunrise, Florida when guitarist Pete Townshend left the stage during "You Better You Bet", claiming not to be able to hear the sound properly. The show ended prematurely with the rest of the group playing "Baba O'Riley" without him. Drummer Zak Starkey missed six shows from 5 to 14 February due to a tendon injury and was replaced with drummer Scott Devours, who had toured with Roger Daltrey a few years earlier. Devours again filled in for Starkey for the band's June–July European tour.

"Tea and Theatre", the final track from the group's 2006 album Endless Wire, once again closed most shows on the tour as in recent years.

All songs written by Pete Townshend.
"I Am the Sea"
"The Real Me"
"Quadrophenia"
"Cut My Hair"
"The Punk and the Godfather"
"I'm One"
"The Dirty Jobs"
"Helpless Dancer"
"Is It in My Head?"
"I've Had Enough"
"5.15"
"Sea and Sand"
"Drowned"
"Bell Boy"
"Doctor Jimmy"
"The Rock"
"Love, Reign o'er Me"(Encore)
"Who Are You"
"Behind Blue Eyes"
"Pinball Wizard" (not played on 3 and 5 November, 17 February)
"Baba O'Riley"
"Won't Get Fooled Again" (not played on 1 November)
"Tea and Theatre" (started closing shows on 3 November, but not played 17 February)
Other songs occasionally played were:
 "The Kids Are Alright" (Played on 3 and 5 November
 "Anyway, Anyhow, Anywhere" (Played on 3 November)
 "You Better You Bet" (played on 1 November and 15 June)

12-12-12: The Concert for Sandy Relief Appearance
"Who Are You"
"Bell Boy"
"Pinball Wizard"
"See Me, Feel Me"/"Listening to You"
"Baba O'Riley"
"Love, Reign o'er Me"
"Tea and Theatre"

"WHO Cares" Teen Cancer America Benefit
"Who Are You"
"The Kids Are Alright"
"Behind Blue Eyes"
"Pinball Wizard"
"5.15"
"Drowned"
"You Better You Bet"
"Love, Reign o'er Me"
"Baba O'Riley"
"Won't Get Fooled Again"

Tour dates

Festivals and other miscellaneous performances
This concert was a part of "12-12-12: The Concert for Sandy Relief"

Gross
2012: $16.9 million from 21 shows
2013: $25.5 million from 30 shows
Total available gross: $42.4 million from 51 shows

References

The Who concert tours
2012 concert tours
2013 concert tours